Berges may refer to:

People
 Alexandre Bergès (born 1868), French fencer
 Consuelo Berges (1899–1988), Spanish translator, journalist, writer, and biographer
 David Berges
 Eugène Bergès, French fencer
 Friedel Berges (1903–1969), German swimmer
 Herman Georges Berger
 Hélène Bergès (born 1966), French scientist
 James Berges
 José Berges
 Melani Bergés Gámez (born 1990), Spanish paralympic athlete
 Paul Mayeda Berges (born 1968), American screenwriter and director
 Pedro Bergés (1906–1978), Cuban football player
 Rafael Berges (born 1971), Spanish football player
 Sandrine Bergès (born 1970), French philosopher
 Stéphane Bergès (born 1975), French cyclist
 Àstrid Bergès-Frisbey (born 1986), French-Spanish actress and model
 Émilien-Benoît Bergès (born 1983), French road racing cyclist

Places
 Berges du Lac, Tunisia
 Berges du Rhône, France

German-language surnames
German toponymic surnames